The Poor Act 1555 was a law passed in England by Queen Mary I.  It is a part of the Tudor Poor Laws.

It extended the Poor Act 1552 and added a provision that licensed beggars must wear badges. The provision requiring badges was added to shame local community members into donating more alms to their parish for poor relief.

References

English Poor Laws
Acts of the Parliament of England (1485–1603)
1555 in law
1555 in England